Cathedral of Our Lady of Guadalupe may refer to:

France
Basse-Terre Cathedral (Cathédrale Notre-Dame-de-Guadeloupe de Basse-Terre), Guadeloupe

Mexico
Our Lady of Guadalupe Cathedral, Ciudad Juárez, Chihuahua
Church of Our Lady of Guadalupe (Puerto Vallarta), Jalisco
Cathedral of Our Lady of Guadalupe, Zamora, in Zamora, Michoacán
Our Lady of Guadalupe Cathedral, Huajuapan de León, Oaxaca

Puerto Rico
Ponce Cathedral

United States
Our Lady of Guadalupe Cathedral (Anchorage, Alaska)
Cathedral of Our Lady of Guadalupe (Dodge City, Kansas)
Cathedral Santuario de Guadalupe, in Dallas, Texas

Uruguay
Cathedral of Our Lady of Guadalupe, Canelones

See also
Our Lady of Guadalupe Church (disambiguation)